The Mediterranean Athletics U23 Indoor Championships is a biennial indoor track and field competition open to athletes aged under 23 from Mediterranean nations. Organised by the Mediterranean Athletics Union, it was first held in 2019.

Editions

Championship records

Men

Women

References

Indoor track and field competitions
International athletics competitions
Under-23 athletics competitions
Recurring sporting events established in 2019
Sport in the Mediterranean
Athletics competitions in Europe
Athletics competitions in Africa